Pak Chol-min (born September 21, 1982) is a North Korean judoka. He won the bronze medal in the Men's 66 kg at the 2008 Summer Olympics.

References

External links
 
 
 Athlete bio at the official Olympics site

1982 births
Living people
North Korean male judoka
Judoka at the 2008 Summer Olympics
Olympic judoka of North Korea
Olympic bronze medalists for North Korea
Olympic medalists in judo
Medalists at the 2008 Summer Olympics
Judoka at the 2006 Asian Games
Asian Games competitors for North Korea